John Aneurin Grey Griffith,  (14 October 1918 – 8 May 2010) was a Welsh legal scholar.

Early life and education 
He was born in Cardiff to a Baptist family, Rev. B. Grey Griffith and Bertha. He was educated at Taunton School in Somerset, where he became a pacifist. He graduated with a first-class LLB at the London School of Economics in 1940. He was called to the bar. He was a member of the Peace Pledge Union and initially registered as a conscientious objector during the Second World War, serving two years in the Royal Army Medical Corps. He unregistered as conscientious objector and began officer training in the Indian Army, serving a further two years and left in 1946 as a major.

Career 
After the War he lectured at the University College of Wales from 1946 to 1948 and concurrently completed an LLM at the LSE. He returned to the LSE in 1948 as a lecturer in law, becoming a Reader in English law in 1954. Griffith subsequently became Professor of English Law 1959 to 1970; then he was Professor of Public law from 1970 until he retired in 1984, becoming Emeritus Professor of Public Law. He held a Visiting Professorship at University of California, Berkeley in 1966 and at York University, Toronto in 1985. Post-retirement, he was elected as Chancellor of the University of Manchester, a post he held for seven years. He was elected a Fellow of the British Academy in 1977.

Griffith's legal works, according to Martin Loughlin, "subverted the self-satisfied liberal-democratic view about the nature and functioning of the constitution, replacing it with a more realistic “what actually happens” account...his more explicitly political analyses tended to highlight the authoritarian nature of government and in particular the close political, social and class linkages of the elites in power". Griffith's also "advanced a radical critique of the role of the judiciary, especially when it strayed into the field of politics". Griffith's believed that the idea of "the rule of law" was "a fantasy invented by Liberals of the old school in the late-19th century and patented by the Tories to throw a protective sanctity around certain legal and political institutions and principles which they wish to preserve at any cost".

In its review of Griffith's 1977 work The Politics of the Judiciary, the Times Literary Supplement claimed that Griffith's "ends up aligned with the Baader–Meinhof gang in believing that every criminal trial is categorically unjust". The book subsequently became a bestseller and Lord Denning later complained: "The youngsters believe that we come from a narrow background—it's nonsense—they get it from that man Griffith".

Personal life 
He married Barbara Eirene Garnet, with whom he had two sons and one daughter. In his Who's Who entry, he listed his recreations as "Drinking beer, writing bad verse". He served as a councillor on Marlow council from 1950 to 1955, and Buckinghamshire city council from 1955 to 1961.

Works
(with Harry Street), Principles of Administrative Law (1952).
(with Harry Street), A Casebook of Administrative Law (1964).
Central Departments and Local Authorities (1966).
Parliamentary Scrutiny of Government Bills (1974).
(with Trevor Hartley), Government and Law (1975).
The Politics of the Judiciary (1977).
(with Harriet Harman), Justice Deserted (1979).
Socialism in a Cold Climate (1983).
(with Michael Ryle), Parliament: Functions, Practice and Procedures (1989).
Judicial Politics since 1920: A Chronicle (1993).

Notes

1918 births
2010 deaths
People educated at Taunton School
Alumni of the London School of Economics
Academics of the London School of Economics
Welsh legal scholars
Fellows of the British Academy
Welsh conscientious objectors
British Army personnel of World War II
Royal Army Medical Corps soldiers
Indian Army personnel of World War II
British Indian Army officers
Welsh legal writers
Labour Party (UK) councillors